Vojany Power Station is a thermal power station at Vojany, Slovakia. It consists of 12 units, with 110 MW generation capacity each. Planning of the first plant began in 1959, the project was approved in 1960, and construction began in 1961. It was commissioned in 1966. The second plant was approved in 1966, construction started in 1968, and it was commissioned in 1973–1974.

The first plant was designed to use semi-anthracite coal imported from Ukraine by a purpose-built wide-gauge rail line. Cooling water is supplied from the Zemplínska Šírava reservoir.

The second plant uses heavy fuel oil. Between 1979 and 1985 it was modernized to use also natural gas.

References

Coal-fired power stations in Slovakia
Oil-fired power stations in Slovakia
Natural gas-fired power stations in Slovakia
Chimneys in Slovakia